The discography of Charlotte Church, a Welsh singer-songwriter, actress and television presenter. Church rose to fame in childhood as a classical crossover singer before branching into pop music in 2005.

Albums

Studio albums

Extended plays

Compilation albums

Singles

Video albums
1999 – Voice of an Angel in Concert
2000 – Dream a Dream: Charlotte Church in the Holy Land
2001 – Charlotte Church in Jerusalem
2001 – Plácido Domingo, Charlotte Church, Vanessa Williams and Tony Bennett Our Favourite Things: Christmas in Vienna
2002 – Enchantment from Cardiff, Wales
2002 – Prelude: The Best of Charlotte Church DVD
2004 - Good Charlotte - Live at Brixton Academy
2007 – Charlotte Church's Funny Bits: Best of the Charlotte Church Show: Series 1 & 2
2009 – Voice of an Angel soundtrack

References

Discographies of British artists